Nicholas Van Dyke (September 25, 1738 – February 19, 1789) was an American Founding Father, lawyer, and politician from New Castle in New Castle County, Delaware. He served in the Delaware General Assembly, in the Continental Congress, where he signed the Articles of Confederation, and as president of Delaware.

Early life and family
Van Dyke was born at Berwick, his family's home in St. George's Hundred, New Castle County, Delaware, near the present location of Delaware City. He was the son of Nicholas and Rachael Alee Van Dyke, whose father, Andrew Van Dyke, had moved there from Long Island in New York in 1704. Young Nicholas was educated at home, then read law in Philadelphia where he was admitted to the Pennsylvania Bar in 1765.

Van Dyke returned to New Castle where he lived with his family and began a law practice. He married twice, first in 1766 to Elizabeth Nixon who died in 1770, two weeks after the birth of Nicholas. After her death he married Charlotte Stanley. They made their home in New Castle and had several more children. They were members of Immanuel Episcopal Church.

Professional and political career
Van Dyke entered political life in 1774 as a member of the Boston Relief Committee in Delaware. He then was a member of the Delaware Constitutional Convention of 1776 and served in the State Council for two years beginning with the 1776–77 session. That same year he was appointed judge of Delaware's Admiralty Court, and on February 22, 1777, he was elected to the Continental Congress to replace John Evans who had declined to serve. He remained in Congress through 1781 and signed the Articles of Confederation for Delaware. For five sessions, from 1778–79 until he became president of Delaware in 1783, he served in the State House and was the speaker in the 1780–81 session.

A few months after John Dickinson resigned as president of Delaware in 1782, the Delaware General Assembly held a special vote to choose a successor to the conservative President John Cook. The conservative faction tried to elect John McKinly, who had been the first president, but the Patriot faction won by electing Van Dyke. He took office February 1, 1783, and served until October 27, 1786.

It was during his tenure as president of Delaware that the American Revolution officially ended with the signing of the Treaty of Paris in September 1783. In an attempt to solve one problem resulting from the war, Van Dyke proposed and carried out a plan to pay Delaware's portion of the war debt. Another difficult unresolved war problem was the fate of Loyalist Cheney Clow. Arrested in 1778, tried for and acquitted of treason in 1782, he was then charged with the murder of a member of the posse sent to capture him in 1778. Though there was no evidence that Clow actually killed the man, in May 1783 a jury convicted him and sentenced him to death. Unable politically to pardon Clow, but aware that many responsible people, including Caesar Rodney's brother, Thomas Rodney, believed the man innocent, Van Dyke postponed the execution indefinitely.

Van Dyke returned to the State Senate for single session tenures in 1786–87 and briefly until his death in the 1788–89 session, when he was the speaker.

Death and legacy
Van Dyke died at Berwick and was buried there. Later his remains were removed to the Immanuel Episcopal Church Cemetery at New Castle.

His son, also Nicholas, later represented Delaware in the U.S. House and U.S. Senate. His daughter, Nancy Ann, married Kensey Johns at a 1784 wedding in the Amstel House in New Castle that was attended by General George Washington. Their son, Kensey Johns Jr., would later serve in the U.S. House.

Much of the property surrounding Van Dyke's original home Berwick was taken in 1829 for the Chesapeake & Delaware Canal, but the house remained through the American Civil War. All the remaining lands and home are believed to have been taken when the canal was expanded in 1929. His New Castle home, now known as the Amstel House, still stands on Fourth Street in New Castle and is open to the public.

No known portrait of Nicholas Van Dyke exists.

Almanac
Elections were held October 1 and members of the General Assembly took office on October 20 or the following weekday. State Legislative Councilmen had a three-year term and State Assemblymen had a one-year term. The whole General Assembly chose the Continental Congressmen for a one-year term and it chose the State President for a three-year term.

References

External links
 Biographical Directory of the United States Congress
 Delaware's Governors
 
 The Political Graveyard
 Delaware Historical Society; website
 University of Delaware; Library website
 Amstel House

1738 births
1789 deaths
American people of Dutch descent
18th-century American Episcopalians
People from New Castle, Delaware
People of Delaware in the American Revolution
Delaware lawyers
Delaware Federalists
Members of the Delaware House of Representatives
Delaware state senators
Governors of Delaware
Continental Congressmen from Delaware
18th-century American politicians
Signers of the Articles of Confederation
Burials in New Castle County, Delaware
Independent state governors of the United States
Delaware Independents
People of colonial Delaware
Founding Fathers of the United States